Delta is a rural locality (a settlement) in Buzansky Selsoviet, Krasnoyarsky District, Astrakhan Oblast, Russia. The population was 72 as of 2010. There are 2 streets.

Geography 
Delta is located 42 km northwest of Krasny Yar (the district's administrative centre) by road. Talnikovy is the nearest rural locality.

References 

Rural localities in Krasnoyarsky District, Astrakhan Oblast